King Hill is an unincorporated community in Elmore County, Idaho, United States. King Hill has a post office with ZIP code 83633.

The biochemist Clinton Ballou was born in King Hill in 1923.

History
King Hill's population was estimated at 200 in 1960.

References

Unincorporated communities in Elmore County, Idaho
Unincorporated communities in Idaho